Liivakari is an island belonging to the country of Estonia.Liivakari is located next to Kakumäe.

See also 
 List of islands of Estonia

Islands of Estonia
Landforms of Tallinn